According to Spike Milligan is a series of literary pastiche novels written by Spike Milligan from 1993 to 2000. Each part of the series was a rewriting of an original novel, with surreal comic elements added that fit into certain points of the originals, whilst at the same time poking fun at the situations involved.

The Bible—the Old Testament According to Spike Milligan
The Bible—the Old Testament According to Spike Milligan is a 1993 parody novel and the first book in the series.

The book is an almost verbatim parody of the Old Testament, with some exceptions. It does not list each section by the names featured in the Bible (Genesis, Exodus etc.), and omits some Bible stories, such as the Tower of Babel, to save time.

Frankenstein According to Spike Milligan
Frankenstein According to Spike Milligan is a comic-horror novel released in 1997, the second book in the series. It is a parody of Frankenstein by Mary Shelley.

The story is a simplified and humorous version of the original novel, with minor changes. In this equivalent, Frankenstein's monster is a heavy smoker whose trousers are constantly falling, and Dr. Frankenstein is continually put in a straitjacket when he begins to talk about the monster he created. Also, there are running gags about Dr. Frankenstein's sea voyages during which his ship sinks, the monster disappearing mysteriously because he runs at speeds of 100 mph, and notes by an editor (Milligan) making sarcastic remarks about events in the novel.

The Hound of the Baskervilles According to Spike Milligan
The Hound of the Baskervilles According to Spike Milligan is a spoof of The Hound of the Baskervilles by Sir Arthur Conan Doyle.

The plot is almost the same as the original, the main differences being that the Spike Milligan version is considerably shorter, and there is more humorous content.

Written from the viewpoint of Dr. Watson (who is accompanied by a duck throughout the story), Holmes takes on the case of a strange curse on the Baskerville estate. He wears an odd pair of boots owned by Sir Henry Baskerville, bullies a German butler, and forces Dr. Mortimer to openly exclaim "Fuck!" The illustrations repeatedly show Watson being attacked, or about to be attacked, by a small dog.

Spike Milligan previously had appeared in the 1978 film adaptation of The Hound of the Baskervilles in a cameo role.

The illustrations pay tribute to the Sherlock Holmes films and the portrayal of Holmes and Watson by Basil Rathbone and Nigel Bruce.

Robin Hood According to Spike Milligan
Robin Hood According to Spike Milligan is a 1998 parody novel. Unlike other books in the series, Milligan did not parody any particular book about Robin Hood (although the majority of material parodies the 1956 book The Adventures of Robin Hood by Roger Lancelyn Green), but the whole legend of Robin Hood and the figures involved.

The book portrays Robin Hood as short-tempered, Friar Tuck as a drunkard, and various other figures of the Robin Hood legend in bizarre yet humorous situations.

Characters
Robin Hood - Leader of his band of Merry Men
Little John - Alias "Big Dick"
Will Scarlet - One of the Merry Men
Maid Marian - Robin's wife
King John - Ruler of England
Guy of Gisbourne - Alias "Guy de Custard Gisborne"
Groucho Marx - A junior in the Merry Men

Treasure Island According to Spike Milligan
Treasure Island According to Spike Milligan is a comic novel spoof of Treasure Island by Robert Louis Stevenson. Published in 2000, it is the last book in the series.

In the book, Jim Hawkins has met a rum-addicted sailor known only as "Captain", who leaves Jim a treasure map upon his death. With his father dying, Jim is forced from the Benbow with his mother and his friend Groucho Marx to search for the buried treasure.

The book itself actually breaks the mould from Milligan's previous parody novels. Whilst his previous works were essentially comic versions of the original texts, this version adds Groucho Marx to the cast as the friend of Jim Hawkins and breaks off from the original layout into a script format (usually when Groucho is speaking). 

The story also includes references to his previous works, such as The Hound of the Baskervilles According to Spike Milligan (such as a running gag involving a dog).

Milligan previously starred as Ben Gunn in productions of Treasure Island for the Mermaid Theatre.

The cover of the 2000 edition portrayed Robert Newton as Long John Silver.

Other titles in the series
Black Beauty According to Spike Milligan
Lady Chatterley's Lover According to Spike Milligan
D. H. Lawrence's John Thomas and Lady Jane: According to Spike Milligan—Part II of "Lady Chatterley's Lover"
Wuthering Heights According to Spike Milligan

List of works
Treasure Island According to Spike Milligan
Frankenstein According to Spike Milligan
Robin Hood According to Spike Milligan

References

British comedy novels
Novels by Spike Milligan
Parody novels
Parodies of literature
Great Books